The Southern League is a Minor League Baseball league that has operated in the Southern United States since 1964. Along with the Eastern League and Texas League, it is one of three circuits playing at the Double-A level, which is two grades below Major League Baseball (MLB). 

The league traces its roots to the original Southern League (1885–1899), the Southern Association (1901–1961), and the original South Atlantic League (1904–1963). The later circuit was renamed the Southern League in 1964, and the league elected to maintain records from that season onward. Following MLB's reorganization of the minor leagues in 2021, it operated as the Double-A South for one season before switching back to its previous moniker in 2022. In its inaugural 1964 season, the Southern League consisted of eight teams from Alabama, Georgia, North Carolina, Tennessee, and Virginia. Following contractions, expansions, and relocations, the league consists of eight teams in Alabama, Florida, Mississippi, and Tennessee.

A league champion is determined at the end of each season. The Birmingham Barons have won 7 Southern League titles, the most among all teams in the league, followed by the Jacksonville Suns (6) and the Montgomery Rebels (5).

History

Predecessor leagues (1885–1963)

The original Southern League was formed prior to the 1885 season as an eight-team circuit playing in the Southern United States. It operated at various times as a Class B league. Fraught with financial problems, teams regularly dropped out before the season's end. After being nonoperational in 1891, 1892, and 1897, it disbanded permanently after halting play during the 1899 season.

The Southern Association was formed in 1901 as a Class B circuit operating in nearly the same footprint as the first Southern League. It was elevated to Class A in 1902, Class A1 in 1936, and Double-A in 1946. The Southern Association remained a premier Southern baseball league until Major League Baseball radio and television broadcasts began to undercut attendance in the 1950s. The league disbanded after 1961.

The original South Atlantic League, nicknamed the "SALLY League" and not related to the current South Atlantic League (formerly the Western Carolinas League), was formed in 1904. It operated at Class C until it was elevated to Class B in 1921 and Class A in 1946. A year after the Southern Association's disbandment, the SALLY League took its place at the Double-A level in 1963.

The modern league (1964–2019)

The Double-A SALLY League was reorganized as the Southern League in 1964. It elected to start with a clean slate and not maintain records prior to the 1964 season. The newly minted league wanted to distance itself from the SALLY League's past history in the low minors (Class C was roughly equivalent to an Advanced Rookie league today, while Class B was roughly equivalent to short-season Class A). Additionally, many leagues had contributed to its legacy. In its inaugural campaign, the six-team Southern League consisted of the Asheville Tourists, Birmingham Barons, Charlotte Hornets, Chattanooga Lookouts, Columbus Confederate Yankees, Knoxville Smokies, Lynchburg White Sox, and Macon Peaches. Sam C. Smith, previously president of the SALLY League, served as its president. 

From 1967 to 1969, the league was reduced to six teams. It went back to eight clubs in 1970, but dropped to seven in 1971. With an odd number of teams, the Southern League joined forces with the Double-A Texas League as the Dixie Association in 1971. The two leagues played an interlocking schedule with individual league champions determined at the end of the season. Up to this point, the Southern League champions had been simply the regular season pennant winners. For the first time, the top two Southern League teams met in a best-of-three series to determine champions. The Charlotte Hornets defeated the Asheville Tourists, 2–1, and then defeated the Texas League champion Arkansas Travelers, 3–0, to win the Dixie Association championship. The partnership was dissolved after the season.

President Smith died suddenly in April 1971, and Billy Hitchcock became the new president that August. Hitchcock introduced a number of changes that are still in use today. In 1972, the Southern League was split into two divisions, Eastern and Western. The playoffs, which began in the Dixie Association, were continued and expanded to a best-of-five series. The league also began selecting postseason All-Star teams and issuing awards for the Most Valuable Player, Most Outstanding Pitcher, and Manager of the Year. In 1976, it introduced a split-season format with the schedule divided in half and first and second half champions from each division being crowned. This expanded the playoffs to two rounds with the winners of each half competing for each division's championship and the those winners meeting for the league championship. With the addition of two teams in 1978, the Southern League grew to 10 teams. Other improvements under Hitchcock's presidency included stadium refurbishments and efforts to make the league more family-friendly. Attendance figures rose dramatically during his tenure.

Jim Bragan became president in 1981 after Hitchcock's retirement. Over his 14 years leading the Southern League, attendance continued to grow as several cities built new ballparks. In 1994, Arnold D. Fielkow succeeded Bragan as president, and Don Mincher took over in 2000. Lori Webb became president in 2012 after Mincher's death that March.

Takeover by Major League Baseball (2020–present)
The start of the 2020 season was postponed due to the COVID-19 pandemic before ultimately being cancelled on June 30. As part of Major League Baseball's 2021 reorganization of the minor leagues, the Southern League was reduced to eight teams and temporarily renamed the "Double-A South" for the 2021 season. Following MLB's acquisition of the rights to the names of the historical minor leagues, the Double-A South was renamed the Southern League effective with the 2022 season.

Current teams

Structure and season
The Southern League is currently divided into two divisions, North and South, of four teams each. Previously, from 1972 to 2004, the league was split into Eastern and Western divisions. There were no divisions in place from 1964 to 1970. As of 2020, each club had 140 games scheduled per season. Utilizing a split-season schedule, each half consisted of 70 games. The season typically began during the first or second week of April and concluded in the first week of September on Labor Day.

All-Star Game

The Southern League All-Star Game was an annual midsummer game between two teams of the league's players, one made up of All-Stars from North Division teams and the other from South Division teams. First held in 1964, the event predominantly consisted of a single team of the league's All-Stars versus a Major League Baseball team through 1998. The division versus division format was used continuously from 1999 to 2019. No game was held from 1991 to 1995 as the Southern League and the other two Double-A leagues, the Eastern League and Texas League, participated in the Double-A All-Star Game instead.

Teams timeline

All-time teams

A "^" indicates that team's article redirects to an article of an active team formerly of the Southern League

 Asheville Orioles
 Asheville Tourists^
 Biloxi Shuckers
 Birmingham A's
 Birmingham Barons
 Carolina Mudcats^
 Charlotte Hornets
 Charlotte Knights^
 Charlotte O's
 Chattanooga Lookouts
 Columbus Astros
 Columbus Confederate Yankees
 Columbus Mudcats
 Columbus White Sox
 Evansville White Sox
 Greenville Braves
 Huntsville Stars
 Jackson Generals
 Jacksonville Expos
 Jacksonville Jumbo Shrimp^
 Jacksonville Suns
 Knoxville Blue Jays
 Knoxville Smokies
 Knoxville Sox
 Lynchburg White Sox
 Macon Peaches
 Memphis Chicks
 Mississippi Braves
 Mobile A's
 Mobile BayBears
 Mobile White Sox
 Montgomery Biscuits
 Montgomery Rebels
 Nashville Sounds^
 Nashville Xpress
 Orlando Cubs
 Orlando Rays
 Orlando Sun Rays
 Orlando Twins
 Pensacola Blue Wahoos
 Port City Roosters
 Rocket City Trash Pandas
 Savannah Braves
 Savannah Indians
 Savannah Senators
 Tennessee Smokies
 West Tenn Diamond Jaxx

Champions

League champions have been determined by different means since the Southern League's formation in 1964. Through 1970, champions were the regular-season pennant winners—the team with the best win–loss record at the conclusion of the regular season. The 1971 title was decided in a postseason series between the two teams with the best records. From 1972 to 1975, the winners of each of two divisions competed in a series to determine champions. The league operated using a split season format from 1976 to 2020. Under this format, the winners of each half within each division played for the division championship, and the division winners met to play for the SL title. The 2021 winner was crowned via a series between the two teams with the best full-season records. The 2022 championship will be decided through the same split-season divisional format used for most of the league's existence.

The Birmingham Barons have won 7 Southern League championships, the most among all teams in the league, followed by the Jacksonville Suns (6) and the Montgomery Rebels (5).

Awards
The SL recognizes outstanding players and team personnel annually near the end of each season.

MVP Award

The Most Valuable Player Award is given to honor the best player in the league.

Pitcher of the Year Award

The Pitcher of the Year Award, originally known as the Most Outstanding Pitcher Award, serves to recognize the league's best pitcher.

Manager of the Year Award

The Manager of the Year Award is given to the league's top manager.

Top MLB Prospect Award
The Top MLB Prospect Award, created in 2021, is given to the league's top rookie prospect.

Presidents
Six presidents led the Southern League since its formation:
 1964–1971: Sam C. Smith
 1971–1980: Billy Hitchcock
 1981–1994: Jim Bragan
 1994–2000: Arnold D. Fielkow
 2000–2011: Don Mincher
 2012–2020: Lori Webb

See also

Southern League Hall of Fame
List of Southern League stadiums
Sports league attendances

References
Specific

General

External links

 
1964 establishments in the United States
Sports leagues established in 1964
Minor baseball leagues in the United States